Juan del Campo may refer to:

 Juan del Campo (field hockey) (1923–2010), Spanish field hockey player
 Juan del Campo (bishop) (died 1334)
 Juan del Campo (skier) (born 1994), Spanish alpine ski racer